First Baptist Church (Spanish Seventh-day Adventist Church) is a historic church at 901-907 Bloomfield Street in Hoboken, Hudson County, New Jersey, United States.

It was built in 1890 from a design by French, Dixon & DeSaldern of New York and added to the National Register in 2006.

The church closed in 2014, and in 2017 was being converted into condominiums.

See also 
 National Register of Historic Places listings in Hudson County, New Jersey

References

Churches in Hoboken, New Jersey
Churches on the National Register of Historic Places in New Jersey
Churches completed in 1890
19th-century Baptist churches in the United States
Churches in Hudson County, New Jersey
Baptist churches in New Jersey
Former Seventh-day Adventist institutions
Former churches in New Jersey
National Register of Historic Places in Hudson County, New Jersey
New Jersey Register of Historic Places